Christos Callow was born in Athens in 1955. He studied vocal music at the National Conservatory in Athens and theatre at the Katselis Drama School. In 1979 he was given the part of Archbishop Ansnan in Jesus Christ Superstar. Callow appeared in numerous TV series including Granada Television's production of Lord Elgin and Some Stones of No Value. In 1990, he was selected to represent Greece at the Eurovision Song Contest in Zagreb with the song "Horis Skopo" (Without Purpose). The song was placed 19th out of 22 entries. He was also a candidate in the greek Eurovision finals in 1987 (3rd) and in 1988 (unknown result).

In 2016 he performed in the play Sunset at the Villa Thalia at the Royal National Theatre, written by Alexi Kaye Campbell and directed by Simon Godwin.

References

1960 births
Singers from Athens
20th-century Greek male singers
English people of Greek descent
Greek people of English descent
Eurovision Song Contest entrants for Greece
Eurovision Song Contest entrants of 1990
Living people